Saint-Nazaire Montoir Airport (In French: Aéroport de Saint-Nazaire Montoir)  also referred to as Aéroport de Gron is a primary commercial airport that serves Saint-Nazaire. It is owned and operated by Vinci Airports which purchased the airport from the city in 2005.

Facilities

SNR is located just north of the Loire river. The airport is also home to SkyTraining Flight School and Aviation Center which is located on the other side of the passenger terminal.

Operations
The airport operates scheduled passenger flights with Air France operated by HOP! using ATR 42 aircraft as well as scheduled cargo flights by Airbus Transport International. The airport is home to aircraft manufacturer Airbus which produces aircraft parts on premises and then ships them to Toulouse and other locations for assembly. Airbus also uses the airport for testing aircraft, which happens multiple times monthly. The airport is able to handle aircraft as large as an Airbus A380. In the early 2000s, Airbus made significant airport upgrades with A380 testing in mind. Other aircraft tested at SNR are A350s, A330s and A320s/A319s/A321s.

Airlines and destinations
The following airlines operate regular scheduled and charter flights at Saint-Nazaire Montoir Airport:

Passenger

Cargo

Statistics

Reference

See also
 List of airports in France
 Transport in France

References

External links

 Airport profile at flightradar24.com
 Airport profile at Aéroport.fr
 Airport Weather
 Live Flight Tracker
 Airport Flight Schedule
 Flight Tracker at FlightAware

Airports in Pays de la Loire
Saint-Nazaire